PowerFX Systems AB is a small recording company, based in Stockholm, Sweden. The company has been producing music samples, loops and sound effects since 1995. They also developed singing synthesizers using the VOCALOID engine developed by Yamaha Corporation.

Products and services

Vocaloid 
PowerFX was first introduced to the Vocaloid software after the introduction of the first Vocaloids (Lola and Leon) from the British studio Zero-G at the NAMM Show on January 15, 2004, and were later recommended to Yamaha Corporation by Crypton Future Media. Their first product for the software was "Sweet Ann" a Vocaloid 2 powered voicebank and was first introduced at the Musikmesse fair and later released on June 29, 2007. The boxart of Sweet Ann was based on a Frankenstein's monster. Their second VOCALOID2 "Big Al" was released with the voice provided by ex-employee Frank Sanderson after the intended provider, Elvis Presley impersonator Michael King, was unable to return for further recordings after their initial samples were considered not at a high enough quality to be released. PowerFX began their distribution of voicebanks for the Vocaloid 3 engine, with "Oliver" as their first VOCALOID3, and the first male VOCALOID3. Oliver was developed under Anders Sodergren, the leader of VocaTone, a team of fan-based VOCALOID producers. VocaTone then had PowerFx release their second VOCALOID3, "YOHIOloid", a bilingual male vocal that is capable of singing in English and Japanese, sampled from Swedish singer Yohio. PowerFX released their own Vocaloids into Taiwan boasting new box art for the releases. PowerFX released an American-accented Vocaloid 4 voicebank "Ruby" in 2015. Ruby was developed as a collaboration between PrinceSyo and Mishakeet, her voice actress, with a strong and bright voice in mind. In 2017, the company announced that they would no longer make Vocaloid products.

PowerFX's other music composers include:

SoundShuttle
Swiss Army Synth
Miracle Drumlooper
Dyad
Humbox VM1

Soundation Studio
PowerFX also offers Soundation Studio, an on-line free music making station complete with a number of samples and loops. Users can open their own account and buy additional samples for their account or upload their own samples into the software to work with. Those who sign up can have their own profile and save their work using AudioLocker.

Extracts of PowerFX's Sweet Ann and Big AL were included in Soundation Studio in their Christmas loops and sound release with a competition included.

References

External links

Vocaloid production companies
Privately held companies of Sweden